River Gallo is a Salvadoran-American filmmaker, actor, model, and intersex rights activist. They wrote, directed, and acted in the 2019 short film Ponyboi, which is the first film to feature an openly intersex actor playing an intersex person.

Personal life 
Gallo was born in and grew up in New Jersey. When they turned twelve they learned they had been born without testicles, although the doctor did not tell them they were intersex. The doctor told them they would need to start hormone therapy and have surgery to insert prosthetic testicles when they turned sixteen so they would "look and feel like a normal man". They have since become outspoken about ending unnecessary cosmetic surgeries performed on children with atypical genitals who are not old enough to give informed consent.

Gallo learned about the term "intersex", and that it applied to them, while writing their master's thesis. Gallo is non-binary and queer. They live in Los Angeles, California.

Career 
Gallo left New Jersey to study acting at New York University, where they trained in the Experimental Theatre Wing at the Tisch School of the Arts. After graduating with a bachelor's degree, they attended the University of Southern California's School of Cinematic Arts and earned their master's degree.

Gallo created the short film Ponyboi as their master's thesis while at USC. The film is about an intersex Latine runaway in New Jersey who works in the day at a laundromat and at night as a sex worker. On Valentine's Day, Ponyboi meets and falls in love with a man and begins to overcome his traumatic past. While writing the film, Gallo discovered the term "intersex" and came to realize it described them. Gallo co-directed the film along with their USC classmate Sadé Clacken Joseph. The film is produced by executive producer Stephen Fry and co-producers Emma Thompson and Seven Graham. The film has been screened at festivals including the BFI Flare: London LGBT Film Festival and the Tribeca Film Festival.

Gallo is the founder and CEO of the Gaptoof Entertainment production company.

In 2019, Gallo won the GLAAD Rising Star Grant, which they have said they intend to use to mentor LGBTQIA+ students in Los Angeles public schools. They were also named in Out's "Most Exciting Queers to Follow on Instagram in 2019" list and Paper's "100 People Taking Over 2019" list.

In 2020, Gallo performed in an episode of the Hulu original teen drama series Love, Victor, which is a spinoff of the 2018 film Love, Simon. Gallo appears in episode 8, "Boys' Trip", as the character Kim, who is one of Simon's several LGBT roommates.

Activism 
Gallo is an intersex rights activist, and has spoken out about issues including unnecessary surgery on intersex children. They have supported California Senate Bill 201, which would ban doctors from performing cosmetic surgeries on children with atypical genitals until they are old enough to give informed consent.

References 

Actors from Los Angeles
Actors from New Jersey
American non-binary actors
American writers of Salvadoran descent
Filmmakers from California
Filmmakers from New Jersey
Intersex models
Intersex non-binary people
Intersex rights activists
Intersex writers
LGBT film directors
LGBT models
LGBT people from New Jersey
Living people
Models from Los Angeles
Models from New Jersey
Non-binary models
Non-binary activists
Queer writers
Tisch School of the Arts alumni
University of Southern California alumni
Year of birth missing (living people)
Intersex actors
American non-binary writers